Asteronotus mabilla is a species of sea slug or dorid nudibranch, a marine gastropod mollusk in the family Discodorididae.

Distribution
This species was originally described from the Seychelles and Samoa. It has been reported from Madagascar.

Description

Ecology

References

Discodorididae
Gastropods described in 1877